Hampshire Regional High School is a regional secondary school located in Westhampton, Massachusetts, United States, for students in grades 7–12. The school has approximately 750 students from the towns of Westhampton, Southampton, Williamsburg, Goshen, and Chesterfield. The Principal is Lauren Hotz. The high school Assistant Principal is Alex Seid, and the middle school Assistant Principal is Karen Milch.

The sports teams from Hampshire Regional are called the "Raiders." Team colors are red and white. Sports offered at Hampshire Regional include Soccer, Cross Country, Basketball, Indoor Track, Wrestling, Baseball, Softball, Field Hockey, Track and Field, and Unified Track. Students participating in ice hockey, football, and swimming compete in a co-op arrangement with Easthampton High School teams. Students participating in Nordic Skiing compete in a co-op arrangement with the Mohawk Regional High School team. Students participating in lacrosse compete in a co-op arrangement with the St. Mary's teams.

International

Twinning Arrangements 
The high-school established exchange partnerships with the 'Institution Saint Michel: Collège and Lycée', a Catholic Secondary School with boarding facilities located in Solesmes, France.

References

External links
 

Public middle schools in Massachusetts
Schools in Hampshire County, Massachusetts
Public high schools in Massachusetts